Reynaldo A. Rodriguez (born July 2, 1986) is a Colombian professional baseball first baseman and outfielder for the Tigres de Quintana Roo of the Mexican League.

Career
Rodriguez was signed as an undrafted 19-year-old free agent by the New York Yankees in 2006. He spent that season and the next season performing well in rookie ball. He was released and returned to Colombia where he played in 2008 before being signed by the Yuma Scorpions of the independent Golden Baseball League for the 2009 season.  He had a breakout year in 2009 and headed Baseball America's Independent League Top Prospects List and had his contract purchased by the Boston Red Sox in the off-season.  Always a hitter for average his power developed as he matured and with Boston he made it up to the AAA Pawtucket Red Sox. 

Over the 2012 offseason, he became a free agent and was signed by the Minnesota Twins on December 7, 2012, where he had 21 homeruns and an OPS of .787 for the AA New Britain Rock Cats in 121 games.  In 2014, he continued his hot hitting posting 20 home runs and an .870 OPS while batting .293 in 122 games before being promoted to AAA Rochester. In 2016, he was suspended for 80 games after he tested positive for Stanozolol, a performance-enhancing drug. He elected free agency on November 7, 2016.

On April 12, 2017, Rodríguez was assigned to the Bravos de León of the Mexican Baseball League. He was released on May 2, 2017.

On March 9, 2018, Rodríguez signed with the Winnipeg Goldeyes of the independent American Association. He was released on June 12, 2018.

On June 15, 2018, Rodríguez signed with the Fargo-Moorhead RedHawks of the American Association. He was released on March 12, 2019.

On May 26, 2019, Rodríguez signed with the Tigres de Quintana Roo of the Mexican League. Rodríguez did not play in a game in 2020 due to the cancellation of the Mexican League season because of the COVID-19 pandemic.

International career
Rodriguez played for the Colombian national baseball team in the 2017 World Baseball Classic, 2019 Pan American Games Qualifier, 2019 Pan American Games, and the 2023 World Baseball Classic.

References

External links

1986 births
Living people
Águilas del Zulia players
Colombian expatriate baseball players in Venezuela
Baseball first basemen
Baseball players at the 2019 Pan American Games
Bravos de León players
Colombian expatriate baseball players in Canada
Colombian expatriate baseball players in Mexico
Colombian expatriate baseball players in the United States
Dominican Summer League Yankees players
Colombian expatriate baseball players in the Dominican Republic
Fargo-Moorhead RedHawks players
Fort Myers Miracle players
Greenville Drive players
Gulf Coast Red Sox players
Gulf Coast Yankees players
Lowell Spinners players
Mexican League baseball first basemen
New Britain Rock Cats players
Pawtucket Red Sox players
Sportspeople from Cartagena, Colombia
Portland Sea Dogs players
Rochester Red Wings players
Salem Red Sox players
Tigres de Quintana Roo players
Winnipeg Goldeyes players
Yaquis de Obregón players
Yuma Scorpions players
2017 World Baseball Classic players
2023 World Baseball Classic players
Pan American Games competitors for Colombia